Clifford Ubert Roberts, Jr. (born 1933 or 1934) was a professional American football player who played offensive lineman for one season for the Oakland Raiders. He was born in Philadelphia and was a sergeant in the United States Marine Corps, having served upon his graduation from high school. He studied radio and television at the University of Illinois, where he also played college football.

References

American football offensive linemen
Oakland Raiders players
Illinois Fighting Illini football players
Living people
Place of birth missing (living people)
Year of birth missing (living people)
American Football League players